Richard Lambert Rundles (June 3, 1981 – December 16, 2019) was a Major League Baseball (MLB) relief pitcher who played for the Cleveland Indians in 2008 and 2009. From 1999 to 2012, Rundles played in minor league baseball with the Boston Red Sox, Montreal Expos, Washington Nationals, St. Louis Cardinals, New York Mets, Cleveland Indians and Baltimore Orioles organizations. 

Through 836 minor-league innings, Rundles compiled a 3.39 ERA. A pitcher with good control, he was a third-round draft pick out of high school in 1999. As a starter in Class A ball a year later, he walked 13 while striking out 114 in 132 innings. Various injuries stalled his development until signing with the Indians as a minor-league free agent in January 2007. The Tribe moved Rundles to the bullpen in an attempt to avoid his durability issues.

Sent to the Double-A Akron Aeros in 2007, Rundles went 3-0 with a 1.83 ERA and two saves in 23 games, 21 of which were out of the bullpen. That earned him his first call to Triple-A, where he was 2-4 with a 2.70 ERA in 17 relief outings at Buffalo. Rundles then went to the 2007 Arizona Fall League to continue his transition to relief. He allowed one run in 8 innings (1.04 ERA) over eight outings.

On July 2, Rundles was named to the 2008 Triple-A All-Star Game as the lone representative of the Buffalo Bisons . He was called up to the majors on September 1, and made his debut on September 3, walking the only batter he faced.

During his stint in the majors, Rundles had a total of 6 strikeouts, 2 walks, and gave up 1 earned run through 4 innings of work from the bullpen. Rundles appeared in 7 games for the Tribe that season, compiling a 2.08 ERA.

Rundles was then returned to the Triple-A Columbus Clippers on March 15, 2009.

Rundles was released by the St. Louis Cardinals organization on May 31, 2011.

On June 7, 2012, the Baltimore Orioles purchased Rundles contract from the Lancaster Barnstormers. The Orioles released him in April 2013.

In 9 MLB games, Rundles worked 6 innings and allowed 6 hits and 4 walks while striking out 7 batters. He had a lifetime 1.50 ERA and a 1.667 WHIP.

He served as a pitching coach for the Lancaster Barnstormers of the Atlantic League of Professional Baseball from 2014-2016 and for the University of West Alabama baseball team.

Rundles died on December 16, 2019, from natural causes at the age of 38.

References

External links

1981 births
2019 deaths
People from Chattanooga, Tennessee
Baseball coaches from Tennessee
Baseball players from Tennessee
Major League Baseball pitchers
Cleveland Indians players
Gulf Coast Red Sox players
Clinton LumberKings players
Augusta GreenJackets players
Brevard County Manatees players
Harrisburg Senators players
Binghamton Mets players
St. Lucie Mets players
Springfield Cardinals players
Akron Aeros players
Buffalo Bisons (minor league) players
Columbus Clippers players
Memphis Redbirds players
Lancaster Barnstormers players
Norfolk Tides players
Surprise Rafters players
Tigres de Aragua players
American expatriate baseball players in Venezuela
Minor league baseball coaches
West Alabama Tigers baseball coaches